Cross my Heart and Hope to Die is a 1994 Norwegian film directed by Marius Holst. It is loosely based on Lars Saabye Christensen's novel Gutten som ville være en av gutta. The film was selected as the Norwegian entry for the Best Foreign Language Film at the 67th Academy Awards, but was not accepted as a nominee.

Cast
 Martin Dahl Garfalk as Otto
 Trond Halbo as Johnny
 Jan Devo Kornstad as Frank
 Kjersti Holmen as Mother
 Reidar Sørensen as Father
 Bjørn Sundquist as Bulken
 Bjørn Floberg as Wiik
 Gisken Armand as Sager
 Ingar Helge Gimle as Gregers
 Per Oscarsson as Piano tuner
 Karl Bomann-Larsen as Judge

Awards
The film was nominated to the Golden Bear at the 45th Berlin International Film Festival.

See also
 List of submissions to the 67th Academy Awards for Best Foreign Language Film
 List of Norwegian submissions for the Academy Award for Best Foreign Language Film

References

External links
 
 
 Cross My Heart and Hope to Die at the Norwegian Film Institute

1994 films
1994 drama films
1990s Norwegian-language films
Films directed by Marius Holst
Norwegian drama films